Nancy Salisbury R.S.C.J. (May 15, 1930 – September 27, 2004) was an American Roman Catholic religious sister, educator and academic. Salisbury entered the Religious of the Sacred Heart in 1952 and professed her final vows in 1960.

Education
Salisbury was educated at a Sacred Heart Academy in Overbrook, Philadelphia. She went on to earn a B.A. degree in history from Manhattanville College in 1952 and a M.S. degree in mathematics from the University of Detroit in 1968.

Career
Salisbury was the longtime headmistress of New York's oldest independent school for girls, the Convent of the Sacred Heart. In her two decades as headmistress, starting in 1980, she overhauled the school's curriculum, upgraded its facilities and nearly doubled its enrollment. In 1990, the school received a Blue Ribbon Award for Academic Excellence from the United States Department of Education. She previously taught at Sacred Heart schools in Grosse Pointe, Michigan and Greenwich, Connecticut. 

Salisbury was also vice chairwoman of the board of the New York State Association of Independent Schools (NYSAIS) and headed its accreditation commission. After retiring in 2000, she was a mentor to her congregation's novices in Chicago. She sat on the boards of Sacred Heart schools in Albany, Miami, and Greenwich.

Death
She died in Atherton, California, aged 74, from respiratory failure after a kidney infection.

External links
New York Times obituary
CMJ236
Woodlands Sacred Heart 2004
Woodlands Sacred Heart Academy newsletter 2005
Almanac News

1930 births
2004 deaths
20th-century American educators
University of Detroit Mercy alumni
Manhattanville College alumni
20th-century American Roman Catholic nuns
Educators from New York (state)
20th-century American women educators
21st-century American Roman Catholic nuns
American headmistresses